Kotlina may refer to: 

the following places in Poland:
Kotlina in Gmina Mirsk, Lwówek Śląski County in Lower Silesian Voivodeship (SW Poland)
Other places called Kotlina (listed in Polish Wikipedia)

place in Croatia:
Kotlina, settlement in Croatian Baranja